The Casca River is a river of the state of Mato Grosso, Brazil. It is a tributary of the Roncador River.

Course

The Casca River runs through the Rio da Casca Ecological Station  from south to north.
Further north the Casca river is dammed for the Casca Hydroelectric Plant.
Still further north it joins the Roncador River in an arm of the Manso Dam.

See also
List of rivers of Mato Grosso

References

Sources

Rivers of Mato Grosso